The 1976 Winter Olympics, officially known as the XII Olympic Winter Games, was a winter multi-sport event held in Innsbruck, Austria, from 4 to 15 February 1976. A total of 1,123 athletes representing 37 National Olympic Committees (NOC) participated in 37 events from 10 different sports and disciplines. Two events were contested for the first time: the figure skating discipline of ice dancing, and the men's 1,000 metres in speed skating.

Sixteen NOCs won at least one medal, and twelve of them secured at least one gold. The Soviet Union clinched the first place in the gold and overall medal counts, with 13 and 27, respectively. Moreover, the Soviet team also collected the most silver (6) and bronze (8) medals. The host nation, Austria, concluded its participation with a total of six medals (two golds, two silvers, and two bronzes).
 
Liechtenstein won its first Olympic medals: two bronzes by Willi Frommelt and Hanni Wenzel in the alpine skiing slalom events. East German athletes achieved gold medal sweeps in luge and bobsleigh, which accounted for five of the country's seven Olympic titles. Alpine skier Rosi Mittermaier won the women's downhill and slalom events to give West Germany's two gold medals in these Games. She came close to winning a third in the giant slalom, which would have made her the first woman to win all three Olympic alpine skiing events. Cross-country skier Helena Takalo contributed three of Finland's seven medals by reaching podium place finishes in all of the women's events. Two Dutch speed skaters were responsible for five of their country's six medals: Piet Kleine won the men's 10,000 metres and came second in the 5,000 metres, while Hans van Helden secured bronze medals in the same events and also in the 1,500 metres. Before these Games, Great Britain's last Winter Olympic medal had been a gold at the 1964 Games, also held in Innsbruck. Twelve years later in the same city, the British team won again a single gold medal, this time by figure skater John Curry in the men's singles with a still-standing record total score. The two bronze medals won by Swedish athletes were not enough to prevent this team's performance from becoming the weakest ever in the nation's Winter Olympic history.

Andorra and San Marino sent their first delegations to the Winter Olympics, whereas the Republic of China competed for the second and last time before its return as Chinese Taipei at the 1984 Winter Olympics; none of these teams medalled.

Medal table 

The medal table is based on information provided by the International Olympic Committee (IOC) and is consistent with IOC convention in its published medal tables. By default, the table is ordered by the number of gold medals won by an NOC. The number of silver medals is taken into consideration next and then the number of bronze medals. If nations are still tied, equal ranking is given and they are listed alphabetically.

Change by doping

Galina Kulakova of the Soviet Union finished 3rd in the women's 5 km ski event, but was disqualified due to a positive test for banned substance ephedrine. She claimed that this was a result of using the nasal spray that contained the substance. Both the FIS and the IOC allowed her to compete in the 10 km and the 4×5 km relay. This was the first stripped medal at the Winter Olympics.

See also
 1976 Winter Paralympics medal table
 1976 Summer Olympics medal table

References

External links
 
 
 
 
 

Medal count
1976